
The Anglo-Persian Treaty of 1801 was signed between the English diplomat John Malcolm and the Shah of Persia Fath Ali Shah in 1801.  The Treaty was proposed at the initiative of Great Britain in order to reinforce the Western border of British India, following the threat of French invasion during the Campaign of Egypt.

The treaty was also a response to the Russian conquest of the Kingdom of Kartli-Kakheti and annexation of Georgia in 1800-1801, which was a major concern of Qajar Iran and Britain (due to India).

The Treaty offered English support against Russia and trade advantages, and explicitly provided against French intervention in Persia:

See also
 Iran – United Kingdom relations
 Franco-Persian alliance

References

Citations

Bibliography
 Amini, Iradj (2000). Napoleon and Persia: Franco-Persian relations under the First Empire. Washington, D.C.: Taylor & Francis. .

Treaties of the United Kingdom (1801–1922)
1801 treaties
Treaties of the Qajar dynasty
1801 in the British Empire
Iran–United Kingdom relations
1801 in British law
Bilateral treaties of the United Kingdom
Bilateral treaties of Iran
1800s in Iran